Night at the Museum: Battle of the Smithsonian (also known as Night at the Museum 2: Battle of the Smithsonian) is a 2009 American fantasy comedy film written by Robert Ben Garant and Thomas Lennon, produced by Chris Columbus, Michael Barnathan and Shawn Levy and directed by Levy. The film stars Ben Stiller in the lead role, Amy Adams, Owen Wilson, Steve Coogan, Hank Azaria, Christopher Guest, Alain Chabat, Jon Bernthal and Robin Williams. It is the second installment in the Night at the Museum series, following the original film. The film was released theatrically on May 22, 2009 by 20th Century Fox. Like its predecessor, it received mixed reviews and became a box office success, grossing $413 million on a $150 million budget.

A live-action sequel, Night at the Museum: Secret of the Tomb was released on December 19, 2014, and an animated sequel, Night at the Museum: Kahmunrah Rises Again, was released on the streaming service Disney+ in 2022.

Plot
Three years after the events of the first film, Larry Daley has left his job as night guard at the American Museum of Natural History to start a company selling his own inventions on direct response television. He visits the museum and learns most of the exhibits will be moved to the Smithsonian Institution archives and replaced with holographic displays, but the Tablet of Ahkmenrah will stay behind, leaving the departing exhibits without the ability to come to life at night.

Later, Larry receives a panicked phone call from miniature cowboy Jedediah, who explains that Dexter the monkey brought the tablet to the Smithsonian, where they are under attack by Ahkmenrah's older brother Kahmunrah. Larry travels to Washington, DC and poses as a night guard to sneak into the archives, where he finds his friends trapped by Kahmunrah, who plans to use the tablet's powers to conquer the world.

Aided by General George A. Custer, who is captured, Larry is joined by Amelia Earhart. They evade Kahmunrah's soldiers and trap them inside the photograph of V-J Day in Times Square, leading Kahmunrah to enlist Ivan the Terrible, Napoleon Bonaparte, and Al Capone to retrieve the tablet. Larry is captured, but when the tablet fails to open the Gate of the Underworld, Kahmunrah traps Jedediah in an hourglass and gives Larry one hour to decipher the tablet's combination.

Amelia has fallen in love with Larry, and the statue of Abraham Lincoln at the Lincoln Memorial mistakes them for a couple as they reach the National Air and Space Museum. They encounter various figures from the history of flight, including the Wright brothers, a squadron of Tuskegee Airmen, and Able the space monkey, while a group of Albert Einstein bobbleheads explain that the combination is the value of pi. Napoleon, Ivan, and Capone's troops arrive, prompting Larry and Amelia to escape in the Wright Flyer.

They crash into the Smithsonian, where Kahmunrah uses the combination to open the gate and summon an army of Horus warriors. Miniature Roman general Octavius arrives with the statue of Lincoln, frightening the warriors back to the Underworld, and Amelia gathers an army of allies including Larry's friends and Custer, leading to a climactic battle. Larry helps Custer overcome his fear of repeating the Battle of Little Big Horn, while Octavius rescues Jedediah, and Larry recovers the tablet and turns Capone, Bonaparte, and Ivan against each other. Armed with his flashlight, Larry duels a khopesh-wielding Kahmunrah as Amelia reopens the gate, allowing Larry to banish Kahmunrah to the Underworld.

Flying Larry and the New York exhibits home, Amelia reveals that she knows she is only a wax figure of the real aviator, and she and Larry share a kiss before she takes off back to the Smithsonian. Two months later, Larry has sold his company and made an anonymous donation to renovate the Natural History Museum and extend its nighttime visiting hours when the exhibits are alive; believed to be animatronics and hired reenactors, the exhibits are now able to interact with visitors at night. Back in his old job as night guard, Larry hits it off with a visitor named Tess, who bears a striking resemblance to Amelia.

Cast

Humans
 Ben Stiller as Larry Daley, a night security guard and Amelia’s love interest.
 Ricky Gervais as Dr. McPhee, the curator at the Museum of Natural History and Larry's boss.
 Jake Cherry as Nick Daley, the son of Larry Daley.
 Amy Adams as Tess, a young woman at the end of the movie who looks like Amelia Earhart.
 Mindy Kaling as Docent
 George Foreman as Himself
 Shawn Levy as Infomercial Father
 Ed Helms as Ed, Larry Daley's assistant
 Jonah Hill as Brandon (pronounced "Brundon"), a security guard at the Smithsonian (uncredited)

Exhibits
 Robin Williams as Theodore Roosevelt, the wax statue of the 26th President of the United States.
 Williams also voices the bronze bust of Roosevelt.
 Mizuo Peck as Sacagawea, the polyurethane model of the Lemhi Shoshone woman who is Roosevelt's girlfriend.
 Amy Adams as Amelia Earhart, the first woman to fly across the Atlantic Ocean, and Larry's love interest.
 Owen Wilson as Jedediah, a cowboy minifigure.
 Steve Coogan as Octavius, a Roman soldier minifigure and Jedediah's best friend.
 Hank Azaria as Kahmunrah, a pharaoh who is Ahkmenrah's older brother. 
 Azaria also voices The Thinker, a famous statue and Abraham Lincoln, a statue of the 16th President of the United States.
 Christopher Guest as Ivan the Terrible, the historic Tsar of Russia who allies with Kahmunrah.
 Alain Chabat as Napoleon Bonaparte, the leader of the First French Empire who allies with Kahmunrah.
 Jon Bernthal as young Al Capone, a photographic standee of the gangster and founder of the Chicago Outfit who allies with Kahmunrah.
 Bill Hader as George Armstrong Custer, a military figure who Larry befriends.
 Rami Malek as Ahkmenrah, a mummy of a pharaoh who is the benevolent younger brother of Kahmunrah.
 Patrick Gallagher as a wax model of Attila the Hun, the statue of the leader of the Huns.
 Brad Garrett as Easter Island Head (voice)
 Kerry van der Griend as Neanderthal #1
 Matthew Harrison as Neanderthal #2
 Rick Dobran as Neanderthal #3
 Randy Lee as Hun #1
 Darryl Quon as Hun #2
 Gerald Wong as Hun #3
 Paul Chih-Ping Cheng as Hun #4
 Jonas Brothers as the Cherubs
 Jay Baruchel as Joey Motorola, a sailor who resides in the V-J Day in Times Square photograph.
 Alberta Mayne as Greta Zimmer Friedman (Kissing Nurse)
 Eugene Levy as Albert Einstein Bobbleheads
 Keith Powell as Tuskegee Airman #1
 Craig Robinson as Tuskegee Airman #2
 Clint Howard as Air and Space Mission Control Tech #1
 Matty Finochio as Air and Space Mission Control Tech #2
 Thomas Lennon as Orville Wright
 Robert Ben Garant as Wilbur Wright
 Caroll Spinney as Oscar the Grouch, the famous Sesame Street character that tries to ally with Kahmunrah only to be dismissed because he classified him as "vaguely grouchy." 
 Thomas Morley as Darth Vader, the famous Star Wars character that tries to ally with Kahmunrah only to be turned away because he classified him as "dark."

Production

Development
Writers Robert Ben Garant and Thomas Lennon confirmed to Dark Horizons that they were writing a sequel to Night at the Museum, originally with the tentative title Another Night at the Museum. The writers said that "there'll be existing characters and plenty of new ones."

20th Century Fox announced that the sequel, Night at the Museum: Battle of the Smithsonian, would be released during Memorial Day weekend in 2009. Ben Stiller, Owen Wilson, Steve Coogan, Ricky Gervais, Patrick Gallagher, Jake Cherry, Rami Malek, Mizuo Peck, Brad Garrett and Robin Williams would return for the sequel, with Shawn Levy returning as director.

Filming
The film was mostly filmed in Vancouver and Montreal with some scenes filmed in the Smithsonian in Washington, D.C. A scene was shot at the Lincoln Memorial on the night of May 21, 2008. Scenes were also shot at the American Museum of Natural History in New York on August 18 and 20, 2008.

The trailer was released with Bedtime Stories, Yes Man and Marley & Me in December 2008. The trailer accompanied the film Bride Wars in January, The Pink Panther 2 in February, and Dragonball Evolution in April 2009. The film was also promoted as an opening skit on American Idol, where a replica of the Idol judge seats are being held at the real Smithsonian Institution.

An alternate ending included on the DVD and Blu-ray releases featured the return of Dick Van Dyke as Cecil Fredericks, Bill Cobbs as Reginald, and Mickey Rooney as Gus.

 Filmmakers loaned the Smithsonian Institution props used in the movie which were displayed in the Smithsonian Castle including the pile of artifacts featured in the film. The Smithsonian also made a brochure available online and at museum visitor service desks outlining where to find artifacts.

As of 2009, numerous artifacts which inspired the film were on display at Smithsonian Museums along the National Mall. Many of the artifacts are labeled with "Night at the Museum" logos. Gift shops at the Smithsonian also sell a replica of the Einstein Bobble-head, created specifically as a tie-in to the film.

Music
Alan Silvestri returned to score the sequel. 

Varèse Sarabande issued the score on May 19, 2009.

Additional Music
 "More Than a Woman" (by Bee Gees) – performed by the Jonas Brothers as the cherubs as Larry and Amelia hide from Napoleon's army.
 "My Heart Will Go On" (by Celine Dion) – performed by the Jonas Brothers as the cherubs after Larry and Amelia' kiss.
 "Lovebug" – performed by the Jonas Brothers as the cherubs after Larry and Amelia' kiss.
 "Let's Groove" – performed by Earth, Wind & Fire; used in part during final scene before the end credits.
 "Fly with Me" – performed by the Jonas Brothers; used in the end credits.

Sample credits
"Museum Open Late" incorporates excerpt of "Life in Technicolor" written by Coldplay

Release
A trailer of Night at the Museum: Battle of the Smithsonian was released on December 19, 2008. The film premiered on May 14, 2009 in Washington, D.C. The film released in UK on May 20, 2009, on May 22, 2009 in United States, and in Japan on August 12, 2009.

Reception

Box office
At the end of its box office run, Night at the Museum: Battle of the Smithsonian earned a gross of $177 million in North America and $236 million in other territories, for a worldwide total of $413 million against a budget of $150 million.

On Friday, May 22, 2009, its opening day, the film's estimated gross was $16 million, for second day the film grossed $20 million and for third day the gross was $19 million, coming in ahead of Terminator Salvation (which released on Thursday) in 4,096 theaters at No. 1, reaching up to $54.1 million, with a $13,226 per-theater average over the Memorial Day weekend. By comparison, Night at the Museum reached up to $30 million on its opening weekend in December 2006. For its second weekend, the film grossed $24.35 million, for third weekend $14.6 million.

For the opening weekend of May 22, 2009 the film grossed $49 million while playing in theaters of 56 territories; the film debuted in UK ($6.6 million), Russia ($5.23 million) and France ($5.05 million). The largest market in other territories being UK, Japan, Germany, Australia and France where the film grossed $32.8 million, $21.49 million, $18.78 million, $14.03 million and $13.3 million. The film exhibited at 160 IMAX screens and contributing $5.4 million of the gross. The top grossing IMAX venue was the Smithsonian.

Critical response
The film received mixed reviews from critics. On Rotten Tomatoes, the film has a  approval rating, based on 168 reviews, with an average score of 5.1/10. The site's critical consensus reads, "Night at the Museum: Battle at the Smithsonian is busy enough to keep the kids interested but the slapstick goes overboard and the special effects (however well executed) throw the production into mania". Metacritic gave the film a weighted average score of 42 out of 100 based on reviews from 31 critics, indicating "mixed or average reviews".

Most critics praised Amy Adams' and Hank Azaria's performances. Michael Phillips of the Chicago Tribune awarded the film 3 stars stating that "[Adams]'s terrific -- a sparkling screen presence." Owen Gleiberman of Entertainment Weekly gave the film a B+ stating "Battle of the Smithsonian has plenty of life. But it's Adams who gives it zing." Also, many reviews noted the costume worn by Amy Adams during the movie. Perry Seibert of TV Guide gave the film 2 stars despite honoring that "thanks to Azaria, a master of comic timing. His grandiose, yet slightly fey bad guy is equally funny when he's chewing out minions as he is when deliberating if Oscar the Grouch and Darth Vader are evil enough to join his team. Michael Rechtshaffen of The Hollywood Reporter and A.O. Scott of The New York Times enjoyed both performances.

One critic, Scott Tobias of The A.V. Club, panned the movie for its excessive use of special effects when he described the film as "a baffling master plot and a crowded pileup of special effects in search of something to do." Roger Ebert of the Chicago Sun Times awarded the film 1½ stars out of 4 saying "its premise is lame, its plot relentlessly predictable, its characters with personalities that would distinguish picture books."

In CinemaScore polls conducted during the opening weekend, cinema audiences gave Night at the Museum: Battle of the Smithsonian an average grade of "B+" on an A+ to F scale.

Accolades

Home media
Night at the Museum: Battle of the Smithsonian was made available December 1, 2009, on DVD and Blu-ray as a two-disc Special Edition and a three-disc Digital Copy Edition.

, the film has sold 4,083,829 DVDs and 585,023 Blu-ray discs grossing $51.5 million and $11.7 million totalling $63.2 million in North America.

Video game

The video game based on the film was released on May 5, 2009. It was fairly well received in comparison to the majority of film-based video-games, netting a 7.5 out of 10 from IGN.com.

Sequels

Ben Stiller admitted that a sequel was "a possibility" and on January 21, 2010, co-writer Thomas Lennon said to Access Hollywood, "That after the success of two Night at the Museum films, it's no surprise that 20th Century Fox is looking to develop a third and that those suspicions are indeed true and how could you not? I think it's a really outstanding idea to do Night at the Museum 3, in fact," he said. "I wonder if someone's not even already working on a script for that," he added with a raised eyebrow. "I cannot confirm that for a fact, but I cannot deny it for a fact either... It might be in the works." In an interview, Stiller confirmed the sequel, however, he said that it was only in the "ideas stage".

It was announced in February 2013 that the film, directed by Shawn Levy, would be released on December 25, 2014. On September 10, 2013, it was announced that shooting would start in February 2014. On November 8, 2013, English actor Dan Stevens was cast as Sir Lancelot. On November 15, 2013, it was announced Skyler Gisondo would be replacing Jake Cherry for the role of Nicky Daley.  On December 18, 2013 it was announced that Robin Williams, Stiller, and Ricky Gervais would be returning for the sequel. On January 9, 2014, it was announced that Rebel Wilson would play a security guard in the British Museum. On January 14, 2014, the film's release date was moved up from December 25, 2014, to December 19, 2014. On January 23, 2014, it was announced Ben Kingsley would play an Egyptian Pharaoh at the British Museum. Principal photography and production began on January 27, 2014. In May 2014, principal photography ended.

On August 6, 2019, following the purchase of 21st Century Fox and its assets by The Walt Disney Company, Disney CEO Bob Iger announced that a fully animated sequel of Night at the Museum was in development. Night at the Museum: Kahmunrah Rises Again was released on December 9, 2022 on streaming service Disney+.

References

External links

 
 
 Guide to Smithsonian museums displaying artifacts featured in the movie
 
 

2009 films
2000s adventure comedy films
2000s fantasy comedy films
2000s children's adventure films
1492 Pictures films
20th Century Fox films
20th Century Fox animated films
21 Laps Entertainment films
American films with live action and animation
American adventure comedy films
American sequel films
American slapstick comedy films
Cultural depictions of Abraham Lincoln
Cultural depictions of Amelia Earhart
Cultural depictions of George Armstrong Custer
Cultural depictions of Ivan the Terrible
Cultural depictions of Napoleon
Cultural depictions of Al Capone
Depictions of Napoleon on film
Dune Entertainment films
American fantasy adventure films
Fictional depictions of Abraham Lincoln in film
Films scored by Alan Silvestri
Films about Al Capone
Films directed by Shawn Levy
Films produced by Chris Columbus
Films produced by Michael Barnathan
Films set in museums
Films set in Washington, D.C.
Films shot in Montreal
Films shot in Vancouver
IMAX films
Smithsonian Institution
Slapstick films
2009 comedy films
Night at the Museum
2000s English-language films
2000s American films
Cultural depictions of Theodore Roosevelt